Yuanmiao Temple is a former Taoist temple located in Chengxiang District of Putian, Fujian, China.

History
Xuanmiao Temple was originally built in 628, under the Tang dynasty (618–907). The name was changed into "Tianqing Temple" during the Song dynasty (960–1279), and then to the "Xuanmiao Temple" in 1296 in the following Yuan dynasty (1271–1368). In 1662, Qing dynasty (1644–1911) Kangxi Emperor ascended the throne, due to the social taboo of "Xuan" ("Xuan" is the name of Kangxi Emperor), its name was changed into "Yuanmiao Temple".

In 1407, in the early Ming dynasty (1368–1644), Taoist priest Fang Rudiao and Bu Zhisheng repaired the Hall of Jade Emperor. In 1564, Magistrate Yi Daotan restored the Shanmen. In 1582, Hall of Three Purities, Hall of Dongyue, Hall of Wenchang and Hall of Zhenwu were gradually renovated and refurbished by Lin Zhao'en.

Yuanmiao Temple underwent three renovations in the Qing dynasty (1644–1911), respectively in the ruling of Jiaqing Emperor (1797), in the reign of Xianfeng Emperor (1851–1861) and in the Gaungxu era (1875–1908).

During the Republic of China, the temple was used as barracks for the Nationalists.

After the establishment of the Communist State, the temple was used as campus for Putian No. 4 High School and Putian Normal College.

In October 1956, the Ministry of Culture appropriated a large sum of money for reconstructing the Hall of Three Purities.

In 1961, the Fujian Provincial Government inscribed it as a provincial level cultural heritage. Repairs were carried out in 1975 and again in 1986.

In 1996, it was listed among the fourth batch of "Major National Historical and Cultural Sites in Fujian" by the State Council of China.

Architecture
Along the central axis of the temple stand five buildings including the Shanmen, Hall of Three Purities, Hall of Jade Emperor, Hall of Four Officials and Hall of Wenchang. Subsidiary structures were built on both sides of the central axis including the Hall of Five Emperors, Hall of Dongyue, Hall of Wuxian, Hall of Xiyue, Hall of Lord Guan and Hall of the God of Blessing.

Hall of Three Purities
The Hall of Three Purities in the main hall in the temple with double-eaves gable and hip roofs. It is 7 rooms wide and 6 rooms deep and still maintains the architectural style of Song dynasty (960–1279).

Gallery

References

Bibliography

Taoist temples in Fujian
Buildings and structures in Putian
Tourist attractions in Putian
20th-century establishments in China
20th-century Buddhist temples
[Yuanmiao Temple, Architectura Sinica Site Archive]